The Lane Hotel, also known as the Lane Building, is a historic former hotel building in Eugene, Oregon, United States.

The hotel was added to the National Register of Historic Places in 1977, under its then-current name Palace Hotel.

Opened as the Gross Hotel, and later named Griggs and Palace, the building was used as a hotel until 1978. It was known as the Lane Hotel for 50 years. Today the building houses a variety of offices and small businesses.

See also
National Register of Historic Places listings in Lane County, Oregon

References

External links

Historic image of the Lane Hotel from Salem Public Library

1903 establishments in Oregon
Defunct hotels in Oregon
Hotel buildings completed in 1903
Hotel buildings on the National Register of Historic Places in Eugene, Oregon
Italianate architecture in Oregon